Bradin is both a surname and a given name. Notable people with the name include:

Jean Bradin (1899–1969), French actor
Bradin Hagens (born 1989), American baseball player

See also
Radin